is a Prefectural Natural Park near the coast of southwest Ōsaka Prefecture, Japan. Established in 2011, the park comprises four non-contiguous areas of forested hills in the municipalities of Hannan and Misaki.

See also
 National Parks of Japan
 Kongō-Ikoma-Kisen Quasi-National Park
 Meiji no Mori Minō Quasi-National Park
 Hokusetsu Prefectural Natural Park

References

Parks and gardens in Osaka Prefecture
Protected areas established in 2011